Montalto may refer to:

Places and jurisdictions

Italy 
 Montalto (Apuan Alps) (correctly spelled as Monte Alto or Mont'Alto), a mountain located in Tuscany, Italy and part of the Apuan Alps
 Montalto Carpasio, a comune (municipality) in the Province of Imperia in the Italian region Liguria
 Montalto delle Marche, a municipality in the province of Ascoli Piceno, Marche, Italy
 The former Roman Catholic Diocese of Montalto, with see in the above city
 Montalto di Castro, a municipality in the province of Viterbo, Latium, Italy
 Montalto Dora, a municipality in the province of Turin, Piedmont, Italy
 Montalto Ligure, a municipality in the province of Imperia, Liguria, Italy
 Montalto Pavese, a municipality in the province of Pavia, Lombardy, Italy
 Montalto Uffugo, a municipality in the province of Cosenza, Calabria, Italy
 Castello di Montalto, a castle in the province of Siena, Tuscany, Italy
 Montalto (Aspromonte), an Italian mountain peak

New Zealand
 Montalto, New Zealand, a locality in the Ashburton District

United States 
 Montalto, a mountain overlooking Thomas Jefferson's plantation Monticello

People 
 Duke of Montalto (title), a Spanish hereditary title created on 1 January 1507
 Gonzalo Fernández de Córdoba (1453–1515)
 Duke of Montalto (defunct), a Spanish hereditary title, also known as Duke of Montalto de Aragón, created on 27 May 1507
 Ferdinando d' Aragona y Guardato, 1st Duke of Montalto (fl. 1494–1542)
 Luis Guillermo de Moncada, 7th Duke of Montalto (1614–1672), Spanish noble and Catholic cardinal
 Cardinal Montalto, Pope Sixtus V (1520–1590)
 Elijah Montalto (1567–1616), Marrano physician and polemicist
 Gina Montalto (2003–2018), one of the 17 victims who was killed in the Stoneman Douglas High School shooting
 Gioseffo Danedi (1618–1689), Italian painter known as il Montalto
 Alessandro Peretti di Montalto (1571–1623), Italian Catholic cardinal bishop
 Andrea Baroni Peretti Montalto (1572–1629), Roman Catholic cardinal
 Francesco Peretti di Montalto (1597–1655), Italian Catholic cardinal

 Giacomo Montalto (1864-1934), Italian Republican-inspired socialist, politician and lawyer
 John Attard Montalto (born 1953), Maltese politician
 Adriano Montalto (born 1988), Italian footballer

Other uses 
 Palazzo Montalto, also known as Palazzo Mergulese-Montalto, is a late 14th-century palace on the island of Ortygia in Syracuse, Sicily
 Castello di Montalto, located at east of Siena, Italy

 Montalto di Castro Nuclear Power Station, a nuclear power plant at Montalto di Castro in Italy
 Montalto Di Castro Airfield, an abandoned World War II military airfield, located in the province of Viterbo, Italy

See also 
 Montaldo (disambiguation)